The 1981 Notre Dame Fighting Irish football team represented the University of Notre Dame in the 1981 NCAA Division I-A football season. The team played its home games at Notre Dame Stadium in South Bend, Indiana.  Gerry Faust was the new Notre Dame head coach. The offense scored 232 points, while the defense allowed 160 points. It was Notre Dame's first losing season in 18 years.

Rivalries

In the Shillelagh Trophy, Purdue beat Notre Dame.
Notre Dame beat Michigan State to claim the Megaphone Trophy.

Schedule

Roster

Team players drafted into the NFL

Bob Crable - 1982 / Round: 1 / Pick: 23 New York Jets
John Krimm - 1982 / Round: 3 / Pick: 76 New Orleans Saints
Phil Pozderac - 1982 / Round: 5 / Pick: 137 Dallas Cowboys

Awards and honors

References

Notre Dame
Notre Dame Fighting Irish football seasons
Notre Dame Fighting Irish football